Callipero bella is a species of longhorn beetles of the subfamily Lamiinae. It was described by Bates in 1864, and is known from French Guiana, northwestern Brazil, and eastern Ecuador.

References

Beetles described in 1864
Acanthocinini